John Gerard Leonard (born August 7, 1998) is an American professional ice hockey player for the Milwaukee Admirals of the American Hockey League (AHL) as a prospect to the Nashville Predators of the National Hockey League (NHL). Leonard was selected 182nd overall by the San Jose Sharks in the 2018 NHL Entry Draft.

Playing career
Leonard was originally first eligible to be drafted in 2016, but was not selected while playing for the Green Bay Gamblers of the United States Hockey League. After two years with the Gamblers, Leonard joined the University of Massachusetts Amherst ("UMass"), playing for their ice hockey team, the UMass Minutemen while studying Communications and Sport Management. While with the Minutemen, Leonard caught the attention of the San Jose Sharks, who drafted him in the sixth round, 182nd overall in the 2018 NHL Entry Draft despite not having any contact with Leonard during the predraft process. In his third year at UMass, Leonard was a finalist for the Hobey Baker Award and lead all NCAA players in goals, with 27.

On March 31, 2020, Leonard decided to forgo his final year of college eligibility and was signed to a three-year entry-level contract with the Sharks. Leonard made the opening night roster and made his NHL debut against the Arizona Coyotes on January 14, 2021, playing on a line with Evander Kane and Tomáš Hertl. Leonard posted two points in his debut, assisting on goals by both his linemates, helping the Sharks to a 4–3 shootout victory. His first goal came in a 3–2 win over the Anaheim Ducks on February 15, 2021.

After his second full professional season within the Sharks organization, on July 8, 2022, Leonard was traded along with a 2023 third-round pick at the 2022 NHL Entry Draft to the Nashville Predators in exchange for Luke Kunin. On July 18, 2022, Leonard was signed as a restricted free agent to a one-year, two-way contract with the Predators for the  season.

Personal life
Leonard was born on August 7, 1998 to parents John and Cindy Leonard. He has three siblings. John Sr. was an assistant coach for the UMass Minutemen basketball team between 2001 and 2005.

Career statistics

Awards and honours

References

External links

1998 births
Living people
AHCA Division I men's ice hockey All-Americans
American men's ice hockey left wingers
Green Bay Gamblers players
Ice hockey players from Massachusetts
Milwaukee Admirals players
Nashville Predators players
San Jose Barracuda players
San Jose Sharks draft picks
San Jose Sharks players
Sportspeople from Amherst, Massachusetts
UMass Minutemen ice hockey players